The 2005–06 West Virginia Mountaineers men's basketball team represented West Virginia University from Morgantown, West Virginia during the 2005-06 season. The team was led by head coach John Beilein and played their home games at WVU Coliseum. After an early exit in the quarterfinal round of the Big East tournament, the Mountaineers would gain an at-large bid to the NCAA tournament, where they would make a run to the Sweet Sixteen for the second straight season. The team finished with a 22–11 record (11–5 Big East).

Roster

Schedule and results

|-
!colspan=9 style=| Regular season

|-
!colspan=9 style=| Big East tournament

|-
!colspan=9 style=| NCAA Tournament

Rankings

References

West Virginia
West Virginia Mountaineers men's basketball seasons
West Virginia
West Virginia Mountaineers men's basketball
West Virginia Mountaineers men's basketball